Hawkfield is a townland  in County Kildare, Ireland. It is located on the R416 regional road north of Newbridge. It lies between Newbridge town and Milltown village. It is positioned between Pollardstown Fen and the Bog of Allen - both of which are abundant with rare flora and fauna.  It is home to Kildare GAA "centre of excellence".

References

Towns and villages in County Kildare